Abdul Hakim Achmad Aituarauw (given the title Rat Sran Rat Kaimana Umisi VIII; born  in Kaimana, Indonesia) is a member of the DPR-RI West Papua and also king of the Kingdom of Kaimana of West Papua, Indonesia.

Background
Abdul Hakim Achmad Aituarauw was born into a Kaimana noble family. His father was Muhammad Achmad Rais Aituarauw who was the 7th officially recorded king as well as the leader of pro-Indonesian group of Merdeka Bersama Kaimana Irian Barat (MBKIB) during Dutch rule, through which the people boycotted the celebration of Queen Wilhelmina anniversary every 31 August. In response of this activity, Aituarauw was arrested by the Dutch and was exiled to Ayamaru for 10 years from 1948.

Positions
In addition to serving as a member of the DPR-RI West Papua, he is also the 8th king of the officially recorded Kaimana kingdom.

References

1954 births
Living people
West Papuan people
Members of the People's Representative Council, 2019